In computer science, the word dequeue can be used as:

 A verb meaning "to remove from a queue"
 An abbreviation for double-ended queue (more commonly, deque)